Farzad Hosseinkhani (born March 1, 1981) is an Iranian footballer who plays for Mes Kerman in the Azadegan League.

Club career
Hosseinkhani has played for Mes Kerman since 1998.

Club career statistics

References

1981 births
Living people
Sanat Mes Kerman F.C. players
Iranian footballers
Persian Gulf Pro League players
Azadegan League players
Association football midfielders
People from Kerman Province